Sree Narayana College, Nattika is a Government aided college in Nattika, Thrissur District of Kerala, India. It was founded in the name of Sree Narayana Guru in 1967. It is affiliated to the University of Calicut.

History
Inspired by Sree Narayana Guru's call to seek freedom and enlightenment through education, a few distinguished citizens of Nattika, felt the need to start a College in this backward area. They sought the guidance of Sree Narayana Trusts, Kollam. A meeting presided over by the Late Sri. R. Sankar, held at Ayyanthole, Thrissur, on 15 October 1965 took the decision to establish the College. Consequently, Nattika Sree Narayana College Local Committee was constituted which elected the Late Sri. T. R. Raghavan as President and the Late Adv. N. K. Kuttiraman as Secretary. The committee proceeded with the endeavour to collect funds, acquire land and property and set up a building for the college.

The committee succeeded in collecting the requisite funds within a remarkably short period. The Foundation stone of the building was laid by the Late Sri. R. Sankar in the presence of a large, distinguished gathering on 10 April 1966. The building was completed within the time-limit and affiliation was secured from the University of Kerala.

The college was formally inaugurated by the Late Sri. K. Ayyappan (Sahodaran) on 30 June 1967. The college was affiliated to the newly constituted University of Calicut in July 1969. the college attained the status of a first grade college in Kerala in June 1970 with the commencement of Degree courses in Economics, Commerce, Botany and Zoology. B.Sc. Physics was started in 1978, M. Com in 1979 and B.Sc. Mathematics in 1981. The South-Block was constructed in 1982. B.Sc. Chemistry and M. Sc. Zoology was started in 1983 and, M.Sc. Mathematics in 1984. The construction of the North Block was completed in 1992 and the building was inaugurated by the Late Sri. M. K. Raghavan, the then Gen. Secretary of S.N. Trusts.

The Silver Jubilee of the college was celebrated during 19931994. B.A. Malayalam was started in the same year. The college acquired further progress when M.A. Economics was started in 1995, M.Sc. Physics in 1998, M.Sc. Botany in 1999 and M.Sc. Applied Chemistry in 2001.

Certifications 

With the assessment and accreditation by National Assessment and Accreditation Council with B+ Grade in 2005 the college look forward to scale better heights in the years to come. In 2014, the college was re-accredited by the NAAC with B+ grade.  The college expects co-operation from all the components of the society in maintaining the reputation of this institution as a centre of excellence.

Departments and Courses 
UG Courses (Three years)

The college offers the following degree courses under the University of Calicut: 
 B.A. Malayalam (Main) with Sanskrit and Kerala Culture as subsidiaries.
 B. A. Economics (Main) Indian Constitution & Politics and Modern Indian History as subsidiaries.
 B. Sc. Mathematics (Main) with Statistics and Physics as subsidiaries.
 B.Sc Physics (Main) with Mathematics and Chemistry as subsidiaries.
 B.Sc. Chemistry (Main) Mathematics and Physics as subsidiaries.
 B.Sc. Botany (Main) Zoology and Chemistry as subsidiaries.
 B.Sc. Zoology (Main) Botany and Chemistry as subsidiaries.
 B.Com (With) Co-operation.
PG Courses (Two years)

The college offers the following post graduate courses under the University of Calicut: 
 M.A Economics
 M.A Malayalam
 M.Sc Mathematics
 M.Sc Physics
 M.Sc Chemistry
 M.Sc Botany
 M.Sc Zoology
 M.Com

Admissions 
As the University of Calicut has implemented Single Window System (SWS) for admission in UG and PG Programmes in all affiliated colleges, the students who seek admission to the programmes offered by our college should apply online through the university website. Applicants eligible for fee concession will have to produce the certificates at the time of admission.

Self Financing 
The self-financing wing of the college works as an independent institution known as Sree Narayana Guru College of Advanced Studies, Nattika. With an array of un-aided courses, it has been functioning since 2014 nearby.

Notable alumni
 K. P. Rajendran, Former Minister for Revenue and Land Reforms State of Kerala
 P. Balachandran (politician), Member of Kerala Legislative Assembly 
 T. N. Prathapan, Member of Parliament
 Asokan Charuvil, Malayalam Writer
 K. Rekha, Journalist, Writer

See also 
 List of Sree Narayana Institutions
 Sree Narayana Guru College of Advanced Studies, Nattika
 Sree Kerala Varma College, Thrissur
 Christ College, Irinjalakuda
 St. Thomas College, Thrissur

References

 Sree Narayana College, Nattika
 University of Calicut

Universities and colleges in Thrissur district
Colleges affiliated with the University of Calicut
Educational institutions established in 1967
1967 establishments in Kerala